Gašpinovo  is a small settlement west of Velike Poljane in the Municipality of Ribnica in southern Slovenia. The entire municipality is part of the traditional region of Lower Carniola and is now included in the Southeast Slovenia Statistical Region.

References

External links
Gašpinovo on Geopedia

Populated places in the Municipality of Ribnica